Edmonton railway station or Edmonton station may refer to:
 Edmonton railway station, Queensland at Edmonton, Queensland on the North Coast railway line
 Edmonton station (Via Rail), a station in Canada, opened in 1998
 Edmonton Canadian Pacific Railway Station, a station opened 1913, closed 1972, demolished 1978
 CNR Edmonton station, site upon which CN Tower was built

See also
 Edmonton, London#Railway stations, London
 Edmonton Green railway station, a station in London opened 1872
 Lower Edmonton (low level) railway station, a closed station in London
 Strathcona Canadian Pacific Railway Station, in south Edmonton, Alberta
 Transportation in Edmonton#Inter-city rail, Alberta